Charles Samuel (29 December 1862, in Brussels – 3 February 1938 or 1939, in Cannes) was a Belgian sculptor, engraver and medalist.

Life 
Samuel was born in Brussels and trained there.  He studied engraving with Léopold Wiener, sculpture with Eugène Simonis, Joseph Jaquet and Charles van der Stappen, and medal-making with the goldsmith and sculptor Philippe Wolfers.  He began his career in 1889, from his house and workshop in Ixelles, which was the first project of noted Belgian architect Henri Van Dievoet. His work was part of the sculpture event in the art competition at the 1936 Summer Olympics.

His wife was the French pianist Clotilde Kleeberg.

Work 
 monument to the novelist Charles De Coster at the Place Flagey in Ixelles, modeled by Neel Doff, 1894
 The Lion, Botanical Garden of Brussels, circa 1898
 female figuration of La Brabançonne (Belgian national anthem, in French language of female though in Dutch of male grammatical gender), Surlet de Chokier square, Brussels, 1930
 bronze military memorial at the Ixelles Cemetery
 Vuakusu Batetela defends a woman from an Arab

Notes

External links
 

1862 births
1939 deaths
Artists from Brussels
20th-century Belgian sculptors
19th-century Belgian sculptors
19th-century Belgian male artists
Olympic competitors in art competitions
20th-century Belgian male artists